The 1982 New England Patriots season was the franchise's 13th season in the National Football League and 23rd overall. They finished the National Football League's strike-shortened season with a record of five wins and four losses and finished seventh in the American Football Conference. Due to the format of the playoffs adopted for the season due to the strike, the Patriots qualified as the #7 seed and were eliminated in the first round of the playoffs by the eventual conference champion Miami Dolphins.

After firing Ron Erhardt after a dismal 2-14 season in 1981, the Patriots hired Southern Methodist University head coach Ron Meyer to be their new coach. Meyer led the Patriots to the playoffs for the first time since 1978, where they won the division under Chuck Fairbanks but were defeated in their opening playoff game. 

One of the most notable games in NFL history occurred during the season, when the Patriots hosted the Dolphins in a game played in frozen conditions and under a blanket of snow at Schaefer Stadium. The Patriots won the game 3-0, doing so after a stadium worker used a snowplow to assist kicker John Smith in making the winning field goal.

Staff

Roster

Regular season

Schedule

Note: Intra-division opponents are in bold text.

Standings

Playoffs

See also
New England Patriots seasons

References

New England Patriots
New England Patriots seasons
New England Patriots
Sports competitions in Foxborough, Massachusetts